The PLK Rookie of the Year award is an annual award in the Polish PLK that is given to the best newcomer in the Polish Basketball League. Import players can not win the award. A select group press members votes for the winner of the award.

Winners

References

External links
Polska Liga Koszykówki - Official Site 
Polish League at Eurobasket.com

Rookie of the Year